The 1962–63 season saw Rochdale compete for their 4th season in the Football League Fourth Division.

Statistics

																									
																												

|}

Final League Table

Competitions

Football League Fourth Division

Final League Table

F.A. Cup

League Cup

Lancashire Cup

Rose Bowl

References

Rochdale A.F.C. seasons
Rochdale